"Hasta Siempre, Comandante," ("Until Forever, Commander" in English) or simply "Hasta Siempre," is a 1965 song by Cuban composer Carlos Puebla. The song's lyrics are a reply to revolutionary Che Guevara's farewell letter when he left Cuba, in order to foster revolution in the Congo and later Bolivia, where he was captured and killed.

The lyrics recount key moments of the Cuban Revolution, describing Che Guevara and his role as a revolutionary commander. The song became iconic after Guevara's death, and many left-leaning artists did their own cover versions of the song afterwards. The title is a part of Guevara's well known saying "¡Hasta la victoria siempre!" ("Until victory, always!").

The song has been covered numerous times.

Metrical structure 

Like many of the songs of the author and in line with the tradition of the Cuban and Caribbean music, the song consists of a refrain plus a series of five verses (quatrain), rhyming ABBA, with each line written in octosyllabic verse.

3rd stanza
[1] (1)Vie-(2)nes (3)que-(4)man-(5)do (6)la (7)bri-(8)sa
[2] (1)con (2)so-(3)les (4)de (5)pri-(6)ma-(7)ve-(8)ra
[3] (1)pa-(2)ra (3)plan-(4)tar (5)la (6)ban-(7)de-(8)ra
[4] (1)con (2)la (3)luz (4)de (5)tu (6)son-(7)ri-(8)sa

Lyrics 

Original lyrics in Spanish

Aprendimos a quererte
desde la histórica altura
donde el Sol de tu bravura
le puso cerco a la muerte.

Chorus:
Aquí se queda la clara,
la entrañable transparencia,
de tu querida presencia,
Comandante Che Guevara.

Tu mano gloriosa y fuerte
sobre la Historia dispara
cuando todo Santa Clara
se despierta para verte.

[Chorus]

Vienes quemando la brisa
con soles de primavera
para plantar la bandera
con la luz de tu sonrisa.

[Chorus]

Tu amor revolucionario
te conduce a nueva empresa
donde esperan la firmeza
de tu brazo libertario.

[Chorus]

Seguiremos adelante,
como junto a ti seguimos,
y con Fidel te decimos :
«¡Hasta siempre, Comandante!»

Translated English lyrics

We learned to love you
from the historical heights
where the sun of your bravery
laid siege to death

Chorus:
Here lies the clear,
dear transparency
of your beloved presence,
Commander Che Guevara

Your glorious and strong hand
over History it shoots
when all of Santa Clara
awakens to see you (Your glorious efforts throughout history resound like gunfire awakening Santa Clara.)

[Chorus]

You come burning the breeze
with springtime suns
to plant the flag
with the light of your smile

[Chorus]

Your revolutionary love
leads you to new undertaking
where they are waiting for the firmness
of your liberating arm

[Chorus]

We will carry on
as we followed you then
and with Fidel we say to you:
"Until forever, Commander!"

Versions
There are more than 200 versions of this song.  The song has also been covered by Compay Segundo, Soledad Bravo, Óscar Chávez, Nathalie Cardone, Robert Wyatt, Nomadi, Inés Rivero, Silvio Rodríguez, Ángel Parra, Celso Piña, Veronica Rapella (whose performance is attributed to Joan Baez by a common mistake), Rolando Alarcón, Los Olimareños, Maria Farantouri, Jan Garbarek, Wolf Biermann, Boikot, Los Calchakis (commonly wrongly attributed to Buena Vista Social Club), George Dalaras, Apurimac, Giovanni Mirabassi and Al Di Meola, Ahmet Koç, Mohsen Namjoo, Enrique Bunbury, Verasy, Interitus Dei among others. Although Victor Jara never sang this song, many attribute the Carlos Puebla version to him by mistake.

Nathalie Cardone version

The most commercially successful version of the song was that made by singer Nathalie Cardone and produced by Laurent Boutonnat. Released as "Hasta Siempre", it reached number 2 on the French Singles chart and the top of the Belgian francophone Wallonia charts. The song stayerd 38 weeks on the French charts. A music video was also released.

Tracklists
Single-CD 
"Hasta siempre" - 4:12	
"Hasta siempre (Guitar Mix)" - 4:17

Single-Maxi
"Hasta siempre" - 4:18	
"Hasta siempre (Steve Baltes Extended Club Mix)" - 5:30	
"Hasta siempre (Steve Baltes Remix)" - 6:12	
"Hasta siempre (Steve Baltes On Air Mix)" - 3:45	
"Hasta siempre (Guitar Mix)" - 4:17

Charts

Inés Rivero version

Simultaneously with Nathalie Cardone, Argentine model Inés Rivero released her own version under the title "Che Guevara (Hasta Siempre)". Released on the EMI label and reached number 18 on the French Singles chart. It spent 15 weeks on the French charts. This version was included in the compilation album Hit Express 4 in 1998.

Charts

In popular culture
The first 8 lines of the song have also been rendered as prologue to a melody song in a Malayalam socio-political movie entitled Left Right Left released in 2013, directed by Arun Kumar Aravind and composed by Gopi Sunder.

References

External links

Poems & speeches about Che Guevara
Hasta Siempre Comandante - English & Spanish lyrics
 performed live by Nathalie Cardone
 performed live by Silvio Rodríguez
All versions of Some musics - 200 versions of Hasta Siempre, Comandante

Spanish-language songs
Songs about revolutionaries
Songs about revolutions
1965 songs
Cuban songs
Political songs
Cultural depictions of Che Guevara
Luis Miguel songs
Communist songs